Western Cabaret was a live variety programme series broadcast in 1939 on BBC Television. It was one of several spin-offs from the BBC series Cabaret. It was compered by Big Bill Campbell and produced by Harry Pringle. Four episodes were broadcast. The BBC television service was suspended on 1 September 1939 with the outbreak of World War II, and no further episodes were made.

The Radio Times said that the television studio "will be turned into a camp clearing, with a glowing camp-fire and log huts, and all the artists will be introduced as though they were part of the place".

No episodes have survived.

Performers 
, the following performers who appeared in Western Cabaret are subjects of Wikipedia articles. The numbers of episodes in which they appeared are given in parentheses (treating the broadcasts of 10 January and 12 January as a single episode).

 Gladys (190392) and Will Ahern (18961983), American comedy duo (1)
 Chief White Eagle (19172011), Canadian-born American actor (1)
 Evelyn Dall (19182010), American singer (2)

 Claude Dampier (18791955), English actor and comedian (1)
 Bob Dyer (190984), Australian singer (1)
 Ted North (191675), American actor (3)

See also 
 Cabaret (British TV series)
 Cabaret Cartoons
 Cabaret Cruise
 Comedy Cabaret
 Eastern Cabaret
 Intimate Cabaret

Notes

References

External links

1930s British television series
1939 British television series debuts
1939 British television series endings
Lost BBC episodes
BBC Television shows
Black-and-white British television shows
British variety television shows